In organic chemistry, an alkene is a hydrocarbon containing a carbon–carbon double bond.

Alkene is often used as synonym of olefin, that is, any hydrocarbon containing one or more double bonds. Two general types of monoalkenes are distinguished: terminal and internal.  Also called α-olefins, terminal alkenes are more useful.

However, the International Union of Pure and Applied Chemistry (IUPAC) recommends using the name "alkene" only for acyclic hydrocarbons with just one double bond; alkadiene, alkatriene, etc., or polyene for acyclic hydrocarbons with two or more double bonds; cycloalkene, cycloalkadiene, etc. for cyclic ones; and "olefin" for the general class – cyclic or acyclic, with one or more double bonds.

Acyclic alkenes, with only one double bond and no other functional groups (also known as mono-enes) form a homologous series of hydrocarbons with the general formula  with n being 2 or more (which is two hydrogens less than the corresponding alkane). When n is four or more, isomers are possible, distinguished by the position and conformation of the double bond.

Alkenes are generally colorless non-polar compounds, somewhat similar to alkanes but more reactive. The first few members of the series are gases or liquids at room temperature.  The simplest alkene, ethylene (or "ethene" in the IUPAC nomenclature) is the organic compound produced on the largest scale industrially.

Aromatic compounds are often drawn as cyclic alkenes, however their structure and properties are sufficiently distinct that they are not classified as alkenes or olefins. Hydrocarbons with two overlapping double bonds are called allenes—the simplest such compound is itself called allene—and those with three or more overlapping bonds (etc.) are called cumulenes.  Some authors do not consider allenes and cumulenes to be "alkenes".

Structural isomerism
Alkenes having four or more carbon atoms can form diverse structural isomers. Most alkenes are also isomers of cycloalkanes. Acyclic alkene structural isomers with only one double bond follow:

 : ethylene only
 : propylene only
 : 3 isomers: 1-butene, 2-butene, and isobutylene
 : 5 isomers: 1-pentene, 2-pentene, 2-methyl-1-butene, 3-methyl-1-butene, 2-methyl-2-butene
  : 13 isomers: 1-hexene, 2-hexene, 3-hexene, 2-methyl-1-pentene, 3-methyl-1-pentene, 4-methyl-1-pentene, 2-methyl-2-pentene, 3-methyl-2-pentene, 4-methyl-2-pentene, 2,3-dimethyl-1-butene, 3,3-dimethyl-1-butene, 2,3-dimethyl-2-butene, 2-ethyl-1-butene
 : 27 isomers (calculated)
 : 2,281 isomers (calculated)	
 : 193,706,542,776 isomers (calculated)

Many of these molecules exhibit cis–trans isomerism. There may also be chiral carbon atoms particularly within the larger molecules (from ). The number of potential isomers increases rapidly with additional carbon atoms.

Structure and bonding

Bonding

A carbon–carbon double bond consists of a sigma bond and a pi bond. This double bond is stronger than a single covalent bond (611 kJ/mol for C=C vs. 347 kJ/mol for C–C), but not twice as strong. Double bonds are shorter than single bonds with an average bond length of 1.33 Å (133 pm) vs 1.53 Å for a typical C-C single bond.

Each carbon atom of the double bond uses its three sp2 hybrid orbitals to form sigma bonds to three atoms (the other carbon atom and two hydrogen atoms). The unhybridized 2p atomic orbitals, which lie perpendicular to the plane created by the axes of the three sp² hybrid orbitals, combine to form the pi bond. This bond lies outside the main C–C axis, with half of the bond on one side of the molecule and a half on the other.  With a strength of 65 kcal/mol, the pi bond is significantly weaker than the sigma bond.

Rotation about the carbon–carbon double bond is restricted because it incurs an energetic cost to break the alignment of the p orbitals on the two carbon atoms. Consequently cis or trans isomers interconvert so slowly that they can be freely handled at ambient conditions without isomerization. More complex alkenes may be named with the E–Z notation for molecules with three or four different substituents (side groups). For example, of the isomers of butene, the two methyl groups of (Z)-but-2-ene (a.k.a. cis-2-butene) appear on the same side of the double bond, and in (E)-but-2-ene (a.k.a. trans-2-butene) the methyl groups appear on opposite sides. These two isomers of butene have distinct properties.

Shape
As predicted by the VSEPR model of electron pair repulsion, the molecular geometry of alkenes includes bond angles about each carbon atom in a double bond of about 120°. The angle may vary because of steric strain introduced by nonbonded interactions between functional groups attached to the carbon atoms of the double bond. For example, the C–C–C bond angle in propylene is 123.9°.

For bridged alkenes, Bredt's rule states that a double bond cannot occur at the bridgehead of a bridged ring system unless the rings are large enough. Following Fawcett and defining S as the total number of non-bridgehead atoms in the rings, bicyclic systems require S ≥ 7 for stability and tricyclic systems require S ≥ 11.

Physical properties
Many of the physical properties of alkenes and alkanes are similar: they are colorless, nonpolar, and combustible.  The physical state depends on molecular mass: like the corresponding saturated hydrocarbons, the simplest alkenes (ethylene, propylene, and butene) are gases at room temperature. Linear alkenes of approximately five to sixteen carbon atoms are liquids, and higher alkenes are waxy solids. The melting point of the solids also increases with increase in molecular mass.

Alkenes generally have stronger smells than their corresponding alkanes.  Ethylene has a sweet and musty odor.  The binding of cupric ion to the olefin in the mammalian olfactory receptor MOR244-3 is implicated in the smell of alkenes (as well as thiols).  Strained alkenes, in particular, like norbornene and trans-cyclooctene are known to have strong, unpleasant odors, a fact consistent with the stronger π complexes they form with metal ions including copper.

Reactions
Alkenes are relatively stable compounds, but are more reactive than alkanes. Most reactions of alkenes involve additions to this pi bond, forming new single bonds.  Alkenes serve as a feedstock for the petrochemical industry because they can participate in a wide variety of reactions, prominently polymerization and alkylation.

Except for ethylene, alkenes have two sites of reactivity: the carbon–carbon pi-bond and the presence of allylic CH centers.  The former dominates but the allylic sites are important too.

Addition reactions
Alkenes react in many addition reactions, which occur by opening up the double-bond. Most of these addition reactions follow the mechanism of electrophilic addition. Examples are hydrohalogenation, halogenation, halohydrin formation, oxymercuration, hydroboration, dichlorocarbene addition, Simmons–Smith reaction, catalytic hydrogenation, epoxidation, radical polymerization and hydroxylation.

Hydrogenation and related hydroelementations
Hydrogenation of alkenes produces the corresponding alkanes. The reaction is sometimes carried out under pressure and at elevated temperature.  Metallic catalysts are almost always required. Common industrial catalysts are based on platinum, nickel, and palladium. A large scale application is the production of margarine.

These processes are often of great commercial significance. One example is the addition of H-SiR3, i.e., hydrosilylation. This reaction is used to generate organosilicon compounds.

Hydration
Hydration, the addition of water across the double bond of alkenes, yields alcohols. The reaction is catalyzed by phosphoric acid or sulfuric acid. This reaction is carried out on an industrial scale to produce synthetic ethanol.

CH2=CH2 + H2O -> CH3-CH2OH

Alkenes can also be converted into alcohols via the oxymercuration–demercuration reaction , the hydroboration–oxidation reaction or by Mukaiyama hydration.

Halogenation
In electrophilic halogenation the addition of elemental bromine or chlorine to alkenes yields vicinal dibromo- and dichloroalkanes (1,2-dihalides or ethylene dihalides), respectively. The decoloration of a solution of bromine in water is an analytical test for the presence of alkenes:

CH2=CH2 + Br2 -> BrCH2-CH2Br

Related reactions are also used as quantitative measures of unsaturation, expressed as the bromine number and iodine number of a compound or mixture.

Hydrohalogenation
Hydrohalogenation is the addition of hydrogen halides, such as HCl or HI, to alkenes to yield the corresponding haloalkanes:

If the two carbon atoms at the double bond are linked to a different number of hydrogen atoms, the halogen is found preferentially at the carbon with fewer hydrogen substituents.  This patterns is known as Markovnikov's rule. The use of radical initiators or other compounds can lead to the opposite product result. Hydrobromic acid in particular is prone to forming radicals in the presence of various impurities or even atmospheric oxygen, leading to the reversal of the Markovnikov result:

Halohydrin formation
Alkenes react with water and halogens to form halohydrins by an addition reaction. Markovnikov regiochemistry and anti-stereochemistry occur.

 CH2=CH2 + X2 + H2O -> XCH2-CH2OH + HX

Oxidation 
Alkenes react with percarboxylic acids and even hydrogen peroxide to yield epoxides:
RCH=CH2  +  RCO3H  ->  RCHOCH2 + RCO2H

For ethylene, the epoxidation is conducted on a very large scale industrially using oxygen in the presence of catalysts:
C2H4 + 1/2 O2  ->  C2H4O

Alkenes react with ozone, leading to the scission of the double bond.  The process is called ozonolysis.  Often the reaction procedure includes a mild reductant, such as dimethylsulfide:
RCH=CHR'  +  O3  +  SMe2  -> RCHO  +  R'CHO  +  O=SMe2
R2C=CHR'  +  O3  ->  R2CHO  +  R'CHO  +  O=SMe2

The stoichiometry of the reaction is sensitive to conditions. This reaction and the ozonolysis can be used to determine the position of a double bond in an unknown alkene.

The oxidation can be stopped at the vicinal diol rather than full cleavage of the alkene by using osmium tetroxide or other oxidants:
R'CH=CR2 + 1/2 O2  + H2O  -> R'CH(OH)-C(OH)R2
This reaction is called dihydroxylation.

In the presence of an appropriate photosensitiser, such as methylene blue and light, alkenes can undergo reaction with reactive oxygen species generated by the photosensitiser, such as hydroxyl radicals, singlet oxygen or superoxide ion. Reactions of the excited sensitizer can involve electron or hydrogen transfer, usually with a reducing substrate (Type I reaction) or interaction with oxygen (Type II reaction). These various alternative processes and reactions can be controlled by choice of specific reaction conditions, leading to a wide range of products. A common example is the [4+2]-cycloaddition of singlet oxygen with a diene such as cyclopentadiene to yield an endoperoxide:

Another example is the Schenck ene reaction, in which singlet oxygen reacts with an allylic structure to give a transposed allyl peroxide:

Polymerization

Terminal alkenes are precursors to polymers via processes termed polymerization. Some polymerizations are of great economic significance, as they generate as the plastics polyethylene and polypropylene. Polymers from alkene are usually referred to as polyolefins  although they contain no olefins. Polymerization can proceed via diverse mechanisms. conjugated dienes such as buta-1,3-diene and isoprene (2-methylbuta-1,3-diene) also produce polymers, one example being natural rubber.

Metal complexation

Alkenes are ligands in transition metal alkene complexes. The two carbon centres bond to the metal using the  pi- and pi*-orbitals. Mono- and diolefins are often used as ligands in stable complexes. Cyclooctadiene and norbornadiene are popular chelating agents, and even ethylene itself is sometimes used as a ligand, for example, in Zeise's salt. In addition, metal–alkene complexes are intermediates in many metal-catalyzed reactions including hydrogenation, hydroformylation, and polymerization.

Reaction overview

Synthesis

Industrial methods
Alkenes are produced by hydrocarbon cracking. Raw materials are mostly natural gas condensate components (principally ethane and propane) in the US and Mideast and naphtha in Europe and Asia. Alkanes are broken apart at high temperatures, often in the presence of a zeolite catalyst, to produce a mixture of primarily aliphatic alkenes and lower molecular weight alkanes. The mixture is feedstock and temperature dependent, and separated by fractional distillation. This is mainly used for the manufacture of small alkenes (up to six carbons).

Related to this is catalytic dehydrogenation, where an alkane loses hydrogen at high temperatures to produce a corresponding alkene. This is the reverse of the catalytic hydrogenation of alkenes.

This process is also known as reforming.  Both processes are endothermic and are driven towards the alkene at high temperatures by entropy.

Catalytic synthesis of higher α-alkenes (of the type RCH=CH2) can also be achieved by a reaction of ethylene with the organometallic compound triethylaluminium in the presence of nickel, cobalt, or platinum.

Elimination reactions
One of the principal methods for alkene synthesis in the laboratory is the room elimination of alkyl halides, alcohols, and similar compounds. Most common is the β-elimination via the E2 or E1 mechanism, but α-eliminations are also known.

The E2 mechanism provides a more reliable β-elimination method than E1 for most alkene syntheses. Most E2 eliminations start with an alkyl halide or alkyl sulfonate ester (such as a tosylate or triflate). When an alkyl halide is used, the reaction is called a dehydrohalogenation. For unsymmetrical products, the more substituted alkenes (those with fewer hydrogens attached to the C=C) tend to predominate (see Zaitsev's rule). Two common methods of elimination reactions are dehydrohalogenation of alkyl halides and dehydration of alcohols. A typical example is shown below; note that if possible, the H is anti to the leaving group, even though this leads to the less stable Z-isomer.

Alkenes can be synthesized from alcohols via dehydration, in which case water is lost via the E1 mechanism. For example, the dehydration of ethanol produces ethylene:
CH3CH2OH   →  H2C=CH2 +  H2O

An alcohol may also be converted to a better leaving group (e.g., xanthate), so as to allow a milder syn-elimination such as the Chugaev elimination and the Grieco elimination. Related reactions include eliminations by β-haloethers (the Boord olefin synthesis) and esters (ester pyrolysis).

Alkenes can be prepared indirectly from alkyl amines. The amine or ammonia is not a suitable leaving group, so the amine is first either alkylated (as in the Hofmann elimination) or oxidized to an amine oxide (the Cope reaction) to render a smooth elimination possible. The Cope reaction is a syn-elimination that occurs at or below 150 °C, for example:

The Hofmann elimination is unusual in that the less substituted (non-Zaitsev) alkene is usually the major product.

Alkenes are generated from α-halosulfones in the Ramberg–Bäcklund reaction, via a three-membered ring sulfone intermediate.

Synthesis from carbonyl compounds
Another important method for alkene synthesis involves construction of a new carbon–carbon double bond by coupling of a carbonyl compound (such as an aldehyde or ketone) to a carbanion equivalent. Such reactions are sometimes called olefinations. The most well-known of these methods is the Wittig reaction, but other related methods are known, including the Horner–Wadsworth–Emmons reaction.

The Wittig reaction involves reaction of an aldehyde or ketone with a Wittig reagent (or phosphorane) of the type Ph3P=CHR to produce an alkene and Ph3P=O. The Wittig reagent is itself prepared easily from triphenylphosphine and an alkyl halide. The reaction is quite general and many functional groups are tolerated, even esters, as in this example:

Related to the Wittig reaction is the Peterson olefination, which uses silicon-based reagents in place of the phosphorane.  This reaction allows for the selection of E- or Z-products. If an E-product is desired, another alternative is the Julia olefination, which uses the carbanion generated from a phenyl sulfone. The Takai olefination based on an organochromium intermediate also delivers E-products. A titanium compound, Tebbe's reagent, is useful for the synthesis of methylene compounds; in this case, even esters and amides react.

A pair of ketones or aldehydes can be deoxygenated to generate an alkene. Symmetrical alkenes can be prepared from a single aldehyde or ketone coupling with itself, using titanium metal reduction (the McMurry reaction). If different ketones are to be coupled, a more complicated method is required, such as the Barton–Kellogg reaction.

A single ketone can also be converted to the corresponding alkene via its tosylhydrazone, using sodium methoxide (the Bamford–Stevens reaction) or an alkyllithium (the Shapiro reaction).

Synthesis from alkenes
The formation of longer alkenes via the step-wise polymerisation of smaller ones is appealing, as ethylene (the smallest alkene) is both inexpensive and readily available, with hundreds of millions of tonnes produced annually. The Ziegler–Natta process allows for the formation of very long chains, for instance those used for polyethylene. Where shorter chains are wanted, as they for the production of surfactants, then processes incorporating a olefin metathesis step, such as the Shell higher olefin process are important. 
 
Olefin metathesis is also used commercially for the interconversion of ethylene and 2-butene to propylene. Rhenium- and molybdenum-containing heterogeneous catalysis are used in this process:
CH2=CH2  +  CH3CH=CHCH3   →   2 CH2=CHCH3

Transition metal catalyzed hydrovinylation is another important alkene synthesis process starting from alkene itself. It involves the addition of a hydrogen and a vinyl group (or an alkenyl group) across a double bond.

From alkynes
Reduction of alkynes is a useful method for the stereoselective synthesis of disubstituted alkenes. If the cis-alkene is desired, hydrogenation in the presence of Lindlar's catalyst (a heterogeneous catalyst that consists of palladium deposited on calcium carbonate and treated with various forms of lead) is commonly used, though hydroboration followed by hydrolysis provides an alternative approach. Reduction of the alkyne by sodium metal in liquid ammonia gives the trans-alkene.

For the preparation multisubstituted alkenes, carbometalation of alkynes can give rise to a large variety of alkene derivatives.

Rearrangements and related reactions
Alkenes can be synthesized from other alkenes via rearrangement reactions. Besides olefin metathesis (described above), many pericyclic reactions can be used such as the ene reaction and the Cope rearrangement.

In the Diels–Alder reaction, a cyclohexene derivative is prepared from a diene and a reactive or electron-deficient alkene.

IUPAC Nomenclature
Although the nomenclature is not followed widely, according to IUPAC, an alkene is an acyclic hydrocarbon with just one double bond between carbon atoms. Olefins comprise a larger collection of cyclic and acyclic alkenes as well as dienes and polyenes.

To form the root of the IUPAC names for straight-chain alkenes, change the -an- infix of the parent to -en-. For example, CH3-CH3 is the alkane ethANe. The name of CH2=CH2 is therefore ethENe.

For straight-chain alkenes with 4 or more carbon atoms, that name does not completely identify the compound.  For those cases, and for branched acyclic alkenes, the following rules apply:
 Find the longest carbon chain in the molecule. If that chain does not contain the double bond, name the compound according to the alkane naming rules.  Otherwise:
 Number the carbons in that chain starting from the end that is closest to the double bond.
 Define the location k of the double bond as being the number of its first carbon.
 Name the side groups (other than hydrogen) according to the appropriate rules.
 Define the position of each side group as the number of the chain carbon it is attached to.
 Write the position and name of each side group.
 Write the names of the alkane with the same chain, replacing the "-ane" suffix by "k-ene".

The position of the double bond is often inserted before the name of the chain (e.g. "2-pentene"), rather than before the suffix ("pent-2-ene").

The positions need not be indicated if they are unique.  Note that the double bond may imply a different chain numbering than that used for the corresponding alkane: C–– is "2,2-dimethyl pentane", whereas C–= is "3,3-dimethyl 1-pentene".

More complex rules apply for polyenes and cycloalkenes.

Cis–trans isomerism
If the double bond of an acyclic mono-ene is not the first bond of the chain, the name as constructed above still does not completely identify the compound, because of cis–trans isomerism.  Then one must specify whether the two single C–C bonds adjacent to the double bond are on the same side of its plane, or on opposite sides. For monoalkenes, the configuration is often indicated by the prefixes cis- (from Latin "on this side of") or trans- ("across", "on the other side of") before the name, respectively; as in cis-2-pentene or trans-2-butene.

More generally, cis–trans isomerism will exist if each of the two carbons of in the double bond has two different atoms or groups attached to it.  Accounting for these cases, the IUPAC recommends the more general E–Z notation, instead of the cis and trans prefixes.  This notation considers the group with highest CIP priority in each of the two carbons. If these two groups are on opposite sides of the double bond's plane, the configuration is labeled E (from the German entgegen meaning "opposite"); if they are on the same side, it is labeled Z (from German zusammen, "together").  This labeling may be taught with mnemonic  "Z means 'on ze zame zide'".

Groups containing C=C double bonds
IUPAC recognizes two names for hydrocarbon groups containing carbon–carbon double bonds, the vinyl group and the allyl group.

See also

 Alpha-olefin
 Annulene
 Aromatic hydrocarbon ("Arene")
 Dendralene
 Nitroalkene
 Radialene

Nomenclature links
 Rule A-3. Unsaturated Compounds and Univalent Radicals  IUPAC Blue Book.
 Rule A-4. Bivalent and Multivalent Radicals  IUPAC Blue Book.
 Rules A-11.3, A-11.4, A-11.5 Unsaturated monocyclic hydrocarbons and substituents  IUPAC Blue Book.
 Rule A-23. Hydrogenated Compounds of Fused Polycyclic Hydrocarbons  IUPAC Blue Book.

References